Husein Sastranegara International Airport (Sundanese: ᮘᮔ᮪ᮓᮁ ᮅᮓᮛ ᮄᮔ᮪ᮒᮨᮁᮔᮞᮤᮇᮔᮜ᮪ ᮠᮥᮞᮨᮄᮔ᮪ ᮞᮞ᮪ᮒᮢᮔᮨᮌᮛ)  is an airport in Bandung, West Java, Indonesia. It is located within the city and 2.4 km from Bandung Central train station. The airfield is conjoined with the Husein Sastranegara air force base of the Indonesian Air Force.

The airport is located in the city of Bandung and is surrounded by mountains, thus the landing approach has unique characteristics. This airport runway can handle various aircraft now and in the past, Airbus A320 series, Boeing 737, certain types of Boeing 757 and Boeing 767 (200) series and even Boeing C-17A Globemaster III.

According to the architect who was involved in Husein redevelopment and the early design of Kertajati in 2007, based on similar concept of his design on Beijing Capital International Airport and Beijing Daxing International Airport, the airport is now serving Star Alliance international flights and is one of two international airports serving Greater Bandung, the other being the Kertajati International Airport which is focused on Oneworld and SkyTeam flights. It has been planned as a major destination for Garuda Indonesia as well as the base for Lion Air, Citilink and Indonesia AirAsia. The airport is awarded as the best airport in Asia-Pacific in 2020 (2 to 5 million passengers per annum) by Airports Council International.

History
The Airport was built by Dutch settlers in the colonial period, in Andir village. The airport was named Andir Airfield. Husein Sastranegara Airport is named after an Indonesian aviation hero from West Java, Husein Sastranegara.

In late 2010, the number of flights (take-off and landing) from the airport reached a new high, of over 30 times a day and increasing rapidly.

The Bandung Air Show 2010 took place as a major event for the first time at the airport in September 2010, bringing international aviation audiences.

In 2012, Bandung Air Show took place again at the airport bringing even more international aviation audiences. It was again held in 2013 and 2015, and is now a biennial event.

Prior to 2016, the airport had an ideal capacity of only 750,000 passengers per year, therefore was running extremely over capacity, under-equipped and under-staffed. Currently the combined old and newly built section of terminal provides capacity of roughly 3.5 million passengers per year when all the 2015-2017 redevelopment are finished.

Terminal and facilities
The airport terminal has two concourses which are used for domestic and international flights.

There are two executive lounges, Internet access, LED displays, a prayer room, coffee/tea shops, restaurants, bookstore, shopping arcades and ATMs.

On the north side of the runway, there are airport facilities owned by PT Dirgantara Indonesia. Moreover, the airport is also equipped with PAPI (Precision Approach Path Indicator) and VOR (VHF omnidirectional range), devices that help planes to land at night and other navigation tools.

Since 1 February 2009, international-flight passengers are required to pay an airport tax of IDR 75,000, while domestic flight passengers are required pay an airport tax of IDR 25,000.

PT Angkasa Pura II, as the airport operator, had targeted at mid-year 2010, for the airport runway to be thickened from Pavement Classification Number (PCN) 37 cm to PCN 52 cm, to accommodate larger narrowbody aircraft, such as Airbus A320, Airbus A320neo, Boeing 737, Boeing 737 MAX, and Bombardier CRJ1000 NextGen As of April 2011, the  runway overlay was less than 50-percent complete, although an Airbus A320 has landed.

Kertajati International Airport 

Kertajati International Airport, also known as Majalengka Airport or Bandar Udara Internasional Jawa Barat (BIJB), is an airport at the northeastern part of West Java, Indonesia. Inaugurated on May 24, 2018, the airport is the second largest airport by area in Indonesia after Soekarno-Hatta International Airport. The airport, which has a 3,000 metres long runway, is located in Majalengka Regency, around 68 kilometres east of Bandung. It is constructed to serve as the second international airport of Bandung Metropolitan Area as well as serving Cirebon Metropolitan, and parts of both West Java and Central Java province.

With an annual capacity of 29 million passengers, the airport is set to replace Husein Sastranegara International Airport when all infrastructure are finished. Then, Husein Sastranegara International Airport will only serve limited commercial, military and private aviation.

Airlines and destinations

As a fast-growing international airport, destinations and schedules can change rapidly. The following destinations are served directly from Husein Sastranegara International Airport:

Ground transportation
The airport is located at the end of Pajajaran Street where taxis are widely available. Some hotels in Bandung provide free airport transfer services and car rental also is available. The airport has carpark facilities which can accommodate hundreds of cars.

Accidents and incidents 
 On 17 July 1997, Trigana Air Service Flight 304, operated by a Fokker 27 PK-YPM crashed shortly after takeoff. All 5 crew members and 23 of the 45 passengers on board perished.
 On 6 April 2009, a non-civil Indonesian Air Force Fokker F-27 crashed on landing and hit Hangar D of PT Dirgantara Indonesia (Indonesian Aerospace), killing all 24 people on board. This crash is believed to have been caused by bad weather.
 On 16 April 2009, Merpati Nusantara Airlines flight 616, heading for Surabaya and Denpasar-Bali, failed to take off after running  on the runway and returned to the apron. No injuries or fatalities occurred.
 On 24 September 2010, a privately owned Super Decathlon (registered PK-NZP) crashed after the pilot attempted an acrobatic maneuver. The pilot, Alexander Supeli, an Indonesian aerospace engineer died several days later.
 On 29 September 2012, FASI AS-202 Bravo crashed and killed both the pilot and copilot after the pilot, Nurman Lubis attempted an acrobatic maneuver on Bandung Airshow 2012.

Notes

References

External links 
 PT. Angkasa Pura II: Husein Sastranegara Airport 
 
 "Province looks forward to international airport", The Jakarta Post, 22 December 2006.

Airports in West Java
Transport in West Java